Huntington Township is one of twelve townships in Huntington County, Indiana.  As of the 2020 census, its population was 20,326, making it the most populous township in the county.

Huntington Township was organized in 1834.

History
The Chief Richardville House and Miami Treaty Grounds and Rangeline Road Bridge are listed on the National Register of Historic Places.

Geography
Lakes in the township include Big Blue, Lake Clare, and the J. Edward Roush Reservoir. The stream of Rabbit Run runs through the township.

Cities and towns
 Huntington (the county seat)

Adjacent townships
 Clear Creek Township (north)
 Jackson Township (northeast)
 Union Township (east)
 Rock Creek Township (southeast)
 Lancaster Township (south)
 Polk Township (southwest)
 Dallas Township (west)
 Warren Township (northwest)

Cemeteries
The township contains four cemeteries: Mount Calvary, Mount Hope, Pilgrims Rest and Pleasant Grove.

Major highways
  U.S. Route 24
  U.S. Route 224
  Indiana State Road 5
  Indiana State Road 9
  Indiana State Road 16

Airports and landing strips
 Bowling Airport
 Huntington Municipal Airport

Education
Huntington Township is the home of Huntington University, a Christian liberal arts college with an enrollment of approximately 1,100.

Huntington Township is also home to Huntington North High School, Crestview Middle School, Riverview Middle School, Huntington Catholic School, Flint Springs Elementary School, Lincoln Elementary School, and Horace Mann Elementary School.

Huntington Township residents may obtain a free library card from the Huntington City-Township Public Library in Downtown Huntington.

Notable people

Public Servants
J. Danforth Quayle, Vice-President of the United States, U.S. Senator, U.S. Representative
J. Edward Roush, U.S. Representative, Father of "911 Emergency System"

Artists
Eiffel G. Plasterer, in the mid-1900s, toured America with his "Bubbles Concerto" program.  He was a pioneer in soap bubble art and invented unique bubble-making techniques and equipment.
Denny Jiosa, Grammy nominated jazz guitarist

Sports Players
Chris Kramer, basketball player at Purdue University. Big Ten Defensive Player of the Year, 2008.
Sean Kline, basketball player at Indiana University.
Steve Platt, basketball player and coach at Huntington University. Member of Indiana Basketball Hall of Fame, NAIA Basketball Hall of Fame. Indiana's all-time collegiate scoring leader (3,700 points), seventh all-time on the list of collegiate scorers at any level. Platt twice led the nation in scoring, 1973 and 1974.
Lisa Winter, basketball player at Ball State University and Valparaiso University. Indiana's Miss Basketball 1996.
Matt Pike, football player at Purdue University and in the Arena Football League, 1999–Present. Won AF2 Title with Peoria in 2002.

Points of interest
 Huntington County Historical Museum
 Huntington University Arboretum and Botanical Garden
 Huntington University
 J. Edward Roush Lake
 Merillat Centre for the Arts
 Sheets Wildlife Museum and Learning Center
 Sunken Gardens
 The Forks Of The Wabash
 The Indiana Room Genealogy Center
 United States Vice Presidential Museum
 Victory Noll

Demographics

References
 
 United States Census Bureau cartographic boundary files

External links
 Indiana Township Association
 United Township Association of Indiana
 Official Web site of Huntington, Indiana
 Huntington Herald Press daily newspaper
 Huntington County United Economic Development
 The HUFF 50K Trail Run, a December ultramarathon - one of the 10 largest in North America
 VEEP Triathlon, a triathlon, duathlon and aquathlon held the first weekend in August

Townships in Huntington County, Indiana
Townships in Indiana
1834 establishments in Indiana
Populated places established in 1834